The 2021 ADAC TCR Germany Touring Car Championship was the sixth season of touring car racing to be run by the German-based sanctioning body ADAC to the TCR regulations.

Teams and drivers 
Yokohama is the official tire supplier.

Calendar and results 

The round at Nürburgring planned in early August was postponed after massive flooding in Germany. The new date was set to 6–7 November, making its the series finale.

Drivers' Championship 

Scoring systems

Teams' Championship

Notes

References

External links 
 

ADAC TCR Germany
ADAC TCR Germany Touring Car Championship